This list of museums in North Dakota, United States, is a list of museums, defined for this context as institutions (including nonprofit organizations, government entities, and private businesses) that collect and care for objects of cultural, artistic, scientific, or historical interest and make their collections or related exhibits available for public viewing. Museums that exist only in cyberspace (i.e., virtual museums) are not included.

Museums

Defunct museums
 Cass County Pioneer Village, Ayr

See also
 Nature Centers in North Dakota

References
Historical museums of North Dakota

Museums
North Dakota
Museums